Lambuth Inn, also known as Mission Centenary Inn and the Lambeth Hotel, is a historic hotel building located at Lake Junaluska, Haywood County, North Carolina. It was built in 1921, and is a large Classic Revival style building consisting of a long rectangular block with three short rear wings. It is flanked by buff-colored brick additions extending symmetrically from each end, one made in 1956 and one in 1964.  It features a massive pedimented portico with six three-story Ionic order columns. It was the main hotel facility of the United Methodist Church's Lake Junaluska Assembly. Renovation was done in 1983-1984 and 2018.

It was listed on the National Register of Historic Places in 1982.

References

External links

Properties of religious function on the National Register of Historic Places in North Carolina
Hotel buildings on the National Register of Historic Places in North Carolina
Neoclassical architecture in North Carolina
Hotel buildings completed in 1921
Buildings and structures in Haywood County, North Carolina
National Register of Historic Places in Haywood County, North Carolina
Lake Junaluska, North Carolina